The American Association for Cancer Research elects classes of fellows to recognize influential scientists in the field of cancer research.

Six fellows were appointed to Vice President Biden’s Cancer Moonshot Initiative Blue Ribbon Panel. Several are members of the National Academy of Sciences, several have won a Lasker Award, several have won a Nobel Prize, several are HHMI Investigators, and several are past presidents of the AACR.

References

 
American oncologists
Biology awards